Denise Campbell Bauer (born January 30, 1964) is an American diplomat serving as the United States ambassador to France and Monaco. Bauer served as Ambassador of the United States to Belgium from 2013 to 2017. After being nominated by President Barack Obama, she was confirmed unanimously by the U.S. Senate on August 2, 2013; she was sworn in the following August 7. She left office on January 20, 2017. A member of the Democratic Party, she was the executive director of Women for Biden.

Education 
Bauer graduated from Occidental College in 1986 with a Bachelor of Arts degree in political science, with an emphasis in foreign affairs and national security.

Career 
She began her career in television news in Los Angeles, where she worked as a field producer and researcher for KCBS-TV News from 1985 to 1988, as a news producer for the North American bureau of Nine Network Australia from 1988 to 1990, and as a freelance film and video producer from 1990 to 1992. From 1993 until 1994 she worked as a public affairs officer for the American Red Cross Bay Area in San Francisco. Bauer has been active in public service and community engagement for the past 25 years and, among other positions, served as president of the board of directors of the Belvedere Community Foundation, located in Belvedere, California.

A longtime Democrat, Bauer hosted multiple fundraisers and reportedly raised $4.3 million for President Obama’s two election campaigns, served on the Obama for America National Finance Committee from 2007 to 2008 and from 2011 to 2012, and was finance chair for Women for Obama from 2011 to 2012. She was also on the Democratic National Committee from 2008 to 2012, serving as chair and co-chair of the Women’s Leadership Forum and as co-chair of the National Issues Conference. She has also personally contributed nearly $20,000 to Democratic candidates and organizations.

Ambassador to Belgium 

On June 21, 2013, Bauer was nominated to be the next US ambassador to Belgium by President Barack Obama. Hearings on her nomination were held before the Senate Foreign Relations Committee on July 25, 2013. The committee reported her favorably on July 30, 2013. On August 2, 2013, the Senate confirmed her by voice vote. Bauer served from 2013 to 2017.

Ambassador to France and Monaco 

In June 2021, it was reported that President Joe Biden would nominate Bauer to serve as the United States ambassador to France and Monaco. On July 9, 2021, President Biden nominated Bauer to serve as the United States Ambassador to France. On September 15, 2021, a hearing on her nomination was held before the Senate Foreign Relations Committee. On October 19, 2021, her nomination was reported favorably out of committee. The United States Senate confirmed her on December 18, 2021, by voice vote. She was sworn in on December 23, 2021. She presented her credentials on February 5, 2022.

Personal life
Bauer speaks French.

References

1963 births
Living people
21st-century American diplomats
21st-century American women
Ambassadors of the United States to Belgium
Ambassadors of the United States to France
Ambassadors of the United States to Monaco
American women ambassadors
American women television producers
California Democrats
Occidental College alumni
Television producers from California
American women diplomats